Sarkisov may refer to:

People 
 Artur Sarkisov (born 1987), Armenian football player
 Ashot Sarkisov (1924–2022), Russian nuclear physicist
 Eduard Sarkisov (born 1971), Russian football player
 Dawid Sarkisow (born 1982), Turkmen football player

Other 
 12190 Sarkisov, main-belt asteroid